Barbara Christina Elisabeth Helsingius-Koski (née Helsingius; 27 September 1937 – 9 March 2017) was a Swedish-speaking Finnish singer, poet, and Olympic fencer.

Career
She participated at the 1960 Summer Olympics in foil fencing. Trained as a gym teacher, she took her masters in pedagogy at Stanford University (1963). Interested in American art and folk music, she began to record, and her first release, Barbara (1966), was a collection of American folk songs, translated to Finnish.

From 1968–1975, she lived in Oslo with her husband, Henry William "Hank" Koski, a diplomat at the U.S. embassy. She was the mother of two daughters. Her family lives in Espoo, Finland.

Death
Helsingius died following a long illness on 9 March 2017 in Espoo, Finland at the age of 79.

Prizes
 , Sweden (1989)
 Norsk-finsk kulturpris (1993)
 Nils Ferlin-prisen, (Sweden; 1994)
 Trubadurprisen (1994)
 NordVisa-statuetten ("Liv"; 1995)
 Pro Cultura, Espoo, Finland (1995)

Books
  
  (Schildts) 
 , poetry collection
 Songs Finland Sings, Warner/Chappel Music Finland (2000)

Discography
 Barbara (1966; American folk songs in Finnish)
  (1977; own songs)
  (1978; Finnish version of the above)
  (1981; Finnish songs in Norwegian)
  (1981; own songs)
  (1982; musical settings of the Finnish poets Aale Tynni and Aila Meriluoto)
  (1982; Finnish songs in Norwegian)
 Reflection. Songs from Finland (1984; Finnish songs in English)
  (1986; her own and Finnish songs in Norwegian)
  (1986; Finnish-Swedish songs)
  (1986; Finnish version of above)
  (1992; Nordic songs in Finnish)
  (1996; own and Finnish songs in Swedish)
 Songs Finland Sings (2002; double CD of Finnish poems and songs, classics and songs which she translated to English. Contains 30 artists, including the Serena choir)

References

1937 births
2017 deaths
Sportspeople from Helsinki
Swedish-speaking Finns
Fencers at the 1960 Summer Olympics
20th-century Finnish women singers
Finnish women singer-songwriters
Finnish female foil fencers
Olympic fencers of Finland
Place of death missing